Guido Albert Merkens Jr. (born August 14, 1955) is a former professional American football player who played quarterback, running back, wide receiver, punter and defensive back for ten seasons for the Houston Oilers, New Orleans Saints and Philadelphia Eagles of the National Football League (NFL).

Merkens was a 1973 graduate of Edison High School in San Antonio. He then played both quarterback and defensive back at Sam Houston State University. His versatility became a hallmark of his professional career. In his first two seasons in the NFL, he was primarily a punt return specialist. During his tenure with the Saints, he served as the third-string quarterback, holder for field goals and special teams player; with occasional time as a wide receiver, punter or safety. His penchant for being the emergency backup for all of the aforementioned positions earned him the reputation of a "jack of all trades".

Merkens' father, Guido Sr., served as founding pastor of Concordia Lutheran Church in San Antonio and was a vice-president of the Lutheran Church–Missouri Synod.

In 2007, the Houston Chronicle reported that Merkens was working as the general manager of a CarMax dealership in the city.

References

1955 births
Living people
American football defensive backs
American football punters
American football quarterbacks
American football return specialists
American football wide receivers
Houston Oilers players
National Football League replacement players
New Orleans Saints players
Philadelphia Eagles players
Sam Houston Bearkats football players
Players of American football from San Antonio